Kenneth Roy (26 March 1945 – 5 November 2018) was a Scottish journalist, writer and broadcaster.

Roy was a presenter on the BBC Scotland news programme Reporting Scotland throughout the 1970s and founded the Scottish Review newsletter.

References 

1945 births
2018 deaths
Scottish journalists